Samantha Jo Moore (born December 28, 1988) is a Canadian singer and songwriter whose songs have been recorded and re-cut by Miley Cyrus (“East Northumberland High” from Meet Miley Cyrus), as well as up and coming artists, including Diana DeGarmo (“Then I Woke Up”, “The Difference In Me”, “‘Till You Want Me”, “Boy Like You”, from Blue Skies), and  The Clique Girlz (“Then I Woke Up”, “The Difference In Me”, from Incredible and the EP Clique Girlz) and co-wrote “Falling Down Your Stare” from  Hope 7's self-titled debut album. Additionally, Mexican Pop band, Nikki Clan did a cover of “A Boy Like You” and “The Difference In Me” for their debut album, No Sera Igual.

Background 
Moore grew up in Colborne, Ontario, Canada. She attended East Northumberland Secondary School.

She began performing in summer singing competitions around Ontario. and was 'discovered' in 2002 at age thirteen while competing in the Kingston, Ontario Fall Fair Talent Contest. Six months later she was signed to a standard one record deal with Geffen Records and moved to Los Angeles to write and record music.

Samantha collaborated with well-known industry songwriters such as Curt Frasca, Sabelle Breer, Kara DioGuardi, Robbie Nevil, Matthew Wilder and The Matrix team of Lauren Christy, Graham Edwards and Scott Spock. By the age of sixteen, Samantha had written and collaborated on more than fifty songs.  Many of these songs were recorded, but the release of her debut album was delayed.

Moore’s songs “I Thought the World Was Round", and “Replace You" produced by Avril Lavigne's producers Curt Frasca and Sabelle Breer were featured on MTV’s television series, “The Hills”, the latter being included in the series soundtrack release.  Her song “Pretty” was featured on MTV’s Laguna Beach.

Her first album, Both Sides of Me, was released in September 2007 and contained 25 songs, including the original demo that secured her initial record contract, a cover of the Avril Lavigne song "Breakaway", which also proved to be a huge hit for Kelly Clarkson in 2004. The album showcased Moore’s talents as a singer and her abilities with lyrical songwriting, and was a mix of songs dominated by a pop/rock style, along with a few country styled tracks.

Her second album, “Finally” was released in August 2008 and contains a number of the more popular tracks from her first album, along with the previously unreleased song “They’re There”.

She has signed a million dollar music publishing deal with BMG Music Publishing and has formed her own publishing company, "Sammy Jo Productions Inc."

Discography 
2007: "Both Sides of Me" (which regroups the two next albums, a live version of Here's To U and Then I Woke Up) 		Released by RomanLine Records
2008: "Finally"			Released by RomanLine Records
2009: "Prequel To Finally : Country Based Songs"

References

External links 
Samantha's Myspace Page
Managers at Romanline

Canadian singer-songwriters
Living people
1988 births
Moore, Samantha
21st-century Canadian women singers